Higher Education Commission or Commission on Higher Education may refer to:

Asia
 Higher Education Commission (Pakistan)
 Commission on Higher Education (Philippines)
 Office of the Higher Education Commission

North America
 Higher Learning Commission
 Middle States Commission on Higher Education

See also 
 University Grants Commission (disambiguation)
 University Grants Committee (disambiguation)